"Dreamer" is a song by American R&B singer Chris Brown produced by Troy "R8DIO" Johnson. It is one of the songs featured on the AT&T Team USA Soundtrack. This song was made for 2008 Beijing Olympics and it samples "The Reason" by British R&B singer Lemar.

The song was released as a promotional single on August 7, 2008 on iTunes and has reached number 16 on the Billboard Hot 100.

In New Zealand, the song debuted at number thirty-five on December 29, 2008.

Track listing
UK and Ireland CD single
 "Superhuman" (featuring Keri Hilson)
 "Dreamer"

Charts

References 

2008 singles
Chris Brown songs
Songs written by Chris Brown
2008 songs
Jive Records singles